is a former Nippon Professional Baseball outfielder. He is the outfield/base-running coach for the Chunichi Dragons major league team.

External links

1971 births
Living people
Baseball people from Osaka Prefecture
Japanese baseball players
Nippon Professional Baseball outfielders
Chunichi Dragons players
Japanese baseball coaches
Nippon Professional Baseball coaches
People from Higashiōsaka